The 2020–21 season was Arda's second consecutive season in the Bulgarian First League. It was the club's most successful season yet, with the club both reaching the final of the Bulgarian Cup and qualifying for the UEFA Europa Conference League for the first time in their history.

This article shows player statistics and all matches (official and friendly) that the club played during the 2020–21 season.

Squad

Transfers

In

Notes

Out

Loans in

Loans out

Friendlies

Pre-season

Mid-season

Competitions

Bulgarian First league

Regular season

Table

Results summary

Results by round

Matches

Championship round

Table

Results summary

Results by round

Results

UEFA Europa Conference League qualification

Bulgarian Cup

Squad statistics
Including UEFA Europa Conference league qualification play-off

Appearances
Players with no appearances not included in the list.

Goalscorers

Top assists
Not all goals have an assist.

Clean sheets

Disciplinary record

Awards

 Football manager of 2020: Nikolay Kirov

References

 Arda